The iliac plexus is a twin nerve plexus covering the Common iliac arteries The iliac plexus originates from the aortic bifurcation developing from the abdominal aortic plexus. The superior hypogastric plexus is also a continuation of the abdominal aortic plexus.

Sources 

 

Nerve plexus